The bigeye chimaera (Hydrolagus macrophthalmus) is a species of fish in the family Chimaeridae. It is found in Chile and possibly Ecuador. Its natural habitat is open seas. It is only known from the preabyssal zone off Valparaiso, and may occur as far south as Valdivia and as far north as the Galápagos Islands and  Nicaragua and Guatemala, so may be more widespread, but species research is not abundant.

References

Hydrolagus
Fish described in 1959
Taxonomy articles created by Polbot